Vasula melones is a species of sea snail, a marine gastropod mollusk, in the family Muricidae, the murex snails or rock snails.

Description
The length of the shell attains 49 mm.

The dark chestnut shell is variegated with white, especially upon the periphery and inferior portion of the body. The columella is tinged with pink. The outer lip is frequently black-bordered.

The want of nodules or spines disagrees with the character of the group; yet the relationship of this species with Vasula deltoidea is tolerably close. Sometimes the body whorl is, in adults, constricted around the middle.

Distribution
This marine species occurs off Costa Rica, Panama, Ecuador and the Galapagos Islands.

References

 Claremont, M., Vermeij, G. J., Williams, S. T. & Reid, D. G. (2013). Global phylogeny and new classification of the Rapaninae (Gastropoda: Muricidae), dominant molluscan predators on tropical rocky seashores. Molecular Phylogenetics and Evolution. 66: 91–102.

External links
 Duclos (P. L.). (1832). Description de quelques espèces de pourpres, servant de type à six sections établies dans ce genre. Annales des Sciences Naturelles. 26: 103-112
 Blainville, H. M. D. de. (1832). Disposition méthodique des espèces récentes et fossiles des genres Pourpre, Ricinule, Licorne et Concholépas de M. de Lamarck, et description des espèces nouvelles ou peu connues, faisant partie de la collection du Muséum d'Histoire Naturelle de Paris. Nouvelles Annales du Muséum d'Histoire Naturelle. 1: 189-263, pls 9-12

melones
Gastropods described in 1832